The Hanuman Chalisa (Forty chaupais on Hanuman) is a Hindu devotional hymn (stotra) in praise of Hanuman. It was authored by Tulsidas in the Awadhi language, and is his best known text apart from the Ramcharitmanas. The word "chālīsā" is derived from "chālīs", which means the number forty in Hindi, as the Hanuman Chalisa has 40 verses (excluding the couplets at the beginning and at the end).

Hanuman is a devotee of Rama and one of the central characters of the Ramayana. According to the Shaiva tradition, the deity Hanuman is also an incarnation of Shiva. Folktales acclaim the powers of Hanuman. The qualities of the god Hanuman – his strength, courage, wisdom, celibacy (brahmacharya), his devotion to Rama and the many names by which he is known – are detailed in the Hanuman Chalisa. Recitation or chanting of the Hanuman Chalisa is a common religious practice. The Hanuman Chalisa is the most popular hymn in praise of Hanuman, and is recited by millions of Hindus every day.

Description 
The authorship of the Hanuman Chalisa is attributed to Tulsidas, a poet-saint who lived in the 16th century CE. He mentions his name in the last verse of the hymn. It is said in the 39th verse of the Hanuman Chalisa that whoever chants it with full devotion to Hanuman, will have Hanuman's grace. Among Hindus worldwide, it is a very popular belief that chanting the Chalisa invokes Hanuman's divine intervention in grave problems.

Author 

Tulsidas (1497/1532–1623) was a Hindu poet-saint, reformer and philosopher renowned for his devotion for Rama. A composer of several popular works, he is best known for being the author of the epic Ramcharitmanas, a retelling of the Ramayana in the vernacular Awadhi language. Tulsidas was acclaimed in his lifetime to be a reincarnation of Valmiki, the composer of the original Ramayana in Sanskrit. Tulsidas lived in the city of Varanasi until his death. The Tulsi Ghat in Varnasi is named after him. He founded the Sankat Mochan Hanuman Temple dedicated to Hanuman in Varanasi, believed to stand at the place where he had the sight of Hanuman. Tulsidas started the Ramlila plays, a folk-theatre adaption of the Ramayana. He has been acclaimed as one of the greatest poets in Hindi, Indian, and World literature. The impact of Tulsidas and his works on the art, culture and society in India is widespread and is seen to date in vernacular language, Ramlila plays, Hindustani classical music, popular music, and television series.

Language 
There are 2 couplets in the beginning and one couplet at the ending between the 40 verses of Hanuman Chalisa. The Chalisa detail in the order of his knowledge, devotion to Rama and man without any desire. As with the case of devotional literature, Tulsidas starts the poem with two couplets praising his guru (teacher). The language of Chalisa is in the Awadhi language.

Deity 
The Hindu deity to whom the prayer is addressed is Hanuman, an ardent devotee of Rama (the seventh avatar of Vishnu) and a central character in the Ramayana. A general among the vanaras, Hanuman was a warrior of Rama in the war against the rakshasa king Ravana. Hanuman's exploits are much celebrated in a variety of religious and cultural traditions, particularly in Hinduism, to the extent that he is often the object of worship according to some bhakti traditions, and is the prime deity in many temples known as Hanuman Mandirs. He is one of the seven chiranjivis (immortals). Hanuman also appears in the Mahabharata on Arjuna's chariot as his dhvaja (flag).

Text 

The work consists of forty-three verses – two introductory dohas, forty Chaupais, and one doha in the end. The first introductory doha begins with the word shrī, which refers to Shiva, who is considered the guru of Hanuman. The auspicious form, knowledge, virtues, powers and bravery of Hanuman are described in the first ten Chaupais. Chaupais eleven to twenty describe the acts of Hanuman in his service to Rama, with the eleventh to fifteenth Chaupais describing the role of Hanuman in bringing back Lakshmana to consciousness. From the twenty-first Chaupai, Tulsidas describes the need of Hanuman's kripa. At the end, Tulsidas greets Hanuman with subtle devotion and requests him to reside in his heart and in the heart of devotees. The concluding doha again requests Hanuman to reside in the heart, along with Rama, Lakshmana, and Sita.

Introductory dohas

Hanuman Chalisa

Concluding doha

Commentaries 

Before the 1980s, no commentary had been composed on the Hanuman Chalisa, which Rambhadracharya attributes to the work not being included in printed editions of collected works of Tulsidas. Indubhushan Ramayani authored the first brief commentary on Hanuman Chalisa. Rambhadracharya's Mahaviri commentary in Hindi, authored in 1983, was called the best commentary on Hanuman Chalisa by Rama Chandra Prasad.

Review 
Swami Karpatri considered Hanuman Chalisa to be a supreme pramana, omnipotent and capable of fulfilling all wishes, like the Vedic mantras. Rambhadracharya called it full of auspiciousness and a "jewel amongst stotras", and said that he had witnessed and heard of many instances where the wishes of people reciting the Chalisa with faith were granted.

In popular culture 
The Hanuman Chalisa is recited by millions of Hindus every day, and most practising Hindus in India know its text by heart. The work is known to be popular among people from diverse educational, social, linguistic, musical, and geographical groups.

Classical and folk music 
The Hanuman Chalisa is one of the best selling Hindu religious books and has been sung by many popular bhajan, classical and folk singers. The rendition of Hanuman Chalisa by Hari Om Sharan, originally released in 1974 by the Gramophone Company of India and re-released in 1995 by Super Cassettes Industries, is one of the most popular, and is regularly played at temples and homes across Northern India. This rendition is based on traditional melodies in the Mishra Khamaj, a raga belonging to the Khamaj That, with the base note taken at the second black key (kali do) of the harmonium. A recording based on the same traditional melodies was released in 1992 by Super Cassettes Industries, with Hariharan as the singer and Gulshan Kumar as the artiste.

Other notable renditions include those by bhajan singers Anup Jalota and Ravindra Jain, Hindustani vocalists Pandit Jasraj and Rajan and Sajan Mishra, and the Carnatic vocalist M.S. Subbulakshmi. The renditions by Unni Krishnan, Nithyasree Mahadevan, Pandit Bhimsen Joshi, Ganapathi Sachchidananda Swamiji and Morari Bapu are also popular.

Among western singers Krishna Das has performed the Hanuman Chalisa in both slow and fast formats.

Popular movies 
In the Hindi movie 1920 (directed by Vikram Bhatt), Hanuman Chalisa is frequently used in different scenes. One of the scenes show the protagonist Arjun Singh Rathod (played by Rajneesh Duggal), reciting the Hanuman Chalisa in full. It is used in an important sequence in Bajrangi Bhaijaan, when the protagonist fights back against child traffickers and rescues a little girl from them.

An animation movie named Shri Hanuman Chalisa directed by Charuvi Agarwal and designed by Charuvi Design Labs is a film on Hanuman.

Popular music 
Popular singers who have sung the Hanuman Chalisa include Carnatic singer M. S. Subbulakshmi, as well as Lata Mangeshkar, Mahendra Kapoor, S. P. Balasubrahmanyam, Shankar Mahadevan, Anuradha Paudwal, Kailash Kher, Sukhwinder Singh, and Udit Narayan.

The Hanuman Chalisa was sung by Amitabh Bachchan in chorus with twenty other singers. This recording was released as a part of the Shri Hanuman Chalisa album in 2011 and received an unprecedented response by the releasing music label during November 2011.

A rendition of Hanuman Chalisa sung by Gulshan Kumar and Hariharan became the first and only one devotional song and first on YouTube to cross 3 billion views in November 2022. It is also currently the most viewed Indian music video on YouTube.

See also 
 Shri Ramachandra Kripalu
 Thumak Chalat Rama Chandra

Notes

References

Bibliography 

 
 
 
 
 
 
 
 
 
 
 
 
 

Hanuman
Hindi poetry
Bhakti movement
Hindu music
16th-century poems